Hypotaurine is a sulfinic acid that is an intermediate in the biosynthesis of taurine. Like taurine, it also acts as an endogenous neurotransmitter via action on the glycine receptors. It is an osmolyte with antioxidant properties.

Hypotaurine is derived from cysteine (and homocysteine). In mammals, the biosynthesis of hypotaurine from cysteine occurs in the pancreas. In the cysteine sulfinic acid pathway,  cysteine is first oxidized to its sulfinic acid, catalyzed by the enzyme cysteine dioxygenase. Cysteine sulfinic acid, in turn, is decarboxylated by sulfinoalanine decarboxylase to form hypotaurine. Hypotaurine is enzymatically oxidized to yield taurine by hypotaurine dehydrogenase.

References 

Amines
Sulfinic acids
Glycine receptor agonists